Doyle is an unincorporated community in Ripley County, in the U.S. state of Missouri.

History
A post office called Doyle was established in 1899, and remained in operation until 1916. The community has the name of Calvin Doyle, a local merchant.

References

Unincorporated communities in Ripley County, Missouri
Unincorporated communities in Missouri